Drunken shrimp, also known as drunken prawns, is a popular dish in parts of China based on freshwater shrimp that are sometimes eaten cooked or raw. The shrimp are immersed in liquor to make consumption easier, thus the name “drunken”. Different parts of China have different recipes for the dish.  For example, the shrimp are sometimes soaked in alcohol and then cooked in boiling water rather than served live, and in other recipes cooked shrimp are marinated in alcohol after they are boiled. Another version is based on shrimp that are submerged in a bowl of rice wine. The rice wine forces the shrimp to expel their wastes. Once done, the shrimp are taken from the bowl, de-shelled and eaten alive.

Consuming uncooked freshwater shrimps may be a serious health hazard due to the risk of paragonimiasis.

See also
Odori ebi, the Japanese equivalent

Notes

Sources
 Chinese Home-Style Cooking, Foreign Languages Press, Beijing, 7th Printing, 2005, pp. 127.

External links

 Video of live Chinese drunken shrimp
 Deep End Dining's Live Shrimp Dinner

Shaoxing cuisine
Shrimp dishes
Animal welfare and rights in China
Dishes involving the consumption of live animals
Raw foods
Alcohol in China